Brachiacantha felina is a species of lady beetle in the family Coccinellidae. It is found in North America.

References

Further reading

 

Coccinellidae
Articles created by Qbugbot
Beetles described in 1775
Taxa named by Johan Christian Fabricius